Van Cauter is a surname. Notable people with the surname include:

Carina Van Cauter (born 1962), Belgian politician
Emiel Van Cauter (1931–1975), Belgian cyclist
Gustaaf Van Cauter (born 1948), Belgian cyclist
Stijn Van Cauter, Belgian musician and music producer

Surnames of Dutch origin